Huang Tien-mu or Thomas Huang is a Taiwanese politician. He was appointed chairman of the Financial Supervisory Commission in May 2020. He previously served as chairman of the agency in an acting capacity in 2016.

Early life and education
Huang Tien-mu is also known as Thomas Huang. He obtained a bachelor's degree in banking and finance from National Chengchi University in 1980, master's degree in law from National Sun Yat-sen University (NSYSU) in 1984 and doctoral degree in public administration from the University of Southern California in the United States in 1993. His doctoral dissertation was titled Privatizing public enterprises in developing countries: The case of Taiwan's government-owned banks.

Political career
Huang began his public service career within the Ministry of Finance. He was director of the Bureau of Monetary Affairs fourth division, and later secretary-general, director, and deputy director of the Bureau of Monetary Affairs. He was subsequently named to a range of leadership roles within the Financial Supervisory Commission, serving the FSC  as interim deputy director-general, the FSC itself as secretary-general, and the FSC's  as director general.  In 2012, Huang was named director-general of the FSC's Bureau of Securities and Futures. He remained in that position through September 2013,  when he was appointed to the FSC deputy chairmanship. He assumed the FSC chairmanship in an acting capacity in October 2016. Huang returned to the vice chairmanship when Lee Ruey-tsang was named head of the FSC. He also served under Lee's successor Wellington Koo. When Koo was appointed to the National Security Council in May 2020, Huang was promoted to lead the Financial Supervisory Commission.

References

Political office-holders in the Republic of China on Taiwan
Living people
Year of birth missing (living people)
1950s births
National Chengchi University alumni
National Sun Yat-sen University alumni
University of Southern California alumni